Waun Camddwr is a top of Aran Fawddwy in the south of the Snowdonia National Park in Gwynedd, Wales. It is the highest point on a wide boggy area between the summits of Aran Fawddwy and Glasgwm. It was surveyed after the first Nuttall list was compiled, and found to have just enough prominence to be included. The summit is a rocky outcrop amid an area of heather, long grass and peat bog. Gwaun y Llwyni rises to the south of the summit.

References

External links
 www.geograph.co.uk : photos of Aran Fawddwy and surrounding area

Brithdir and Llanfachreth
Mawddwy
Mountains and hills of Gwynedd
Mountains and hills of Snowdonia
Nuttalls

cy:Aran Fawddwy